Historia Hierosolymitana (Latin for "History of Jerusalem", Middle Latin spelling also  Historia Iherosolimitana and variants) is the name of a number of chronicles of the crusades:

 Robert the Monk's Historia Hierosolymitana (early 12th century).
 Baldric of Dol's Historiae Hierosolymitanae libri IV" (1107/8) 
 Albert of Aix's  Historia Hierosolymitanae expeditionis (early 12th century)
 Peter Tudebode's Historia de Hierosolymitano itinere (early 12th century)
 Gilo of Toucy's Historia de via Hierosolymitana (early 12th century)
 Historia belli sacri, also called the Historia de via Hierosolymis (c. 1130)
 William of Tyre's Historia rerum in partibus transmarinis gestarum ("History of Deeds Done Beyond the Sea") also known as Historia Ierosolimitana (1184)
 Jacques de Vitry's Historia Hierosolymitana, a history of the Holy Land from the advent of Islam until the crusades of his own day, written in 1219
 Marino Sanuto the Elder's Liber Secretorum Fidelium Crucis, otherwise called Historia Hierosolymitana, written in 1307

See also
 List of sources for the Crusades

Crusade chronicles